Mok Ka Sha (born 23 October 1962 in Guangdong) is a Hong Kong table tennis player who represented British Hong Kong at the 1988 Summer Olympics.

Personal life 
Mok is married to former teammate Chan Kong Wah.

References

Hong Kong female table tennis players
Olympic table tennis players of Hong Kong
Table tennis players at the 1988 Summer Olympics
Table tennis players from Guangdong
People from Zhongshan
Table tennis players at the 1986 Asian Games
Living people
1962 births
Asian Games competitors for Hong Kong
20th-century Hong Kong women